Pawan Kumar Tinu  is an Indian politician and belongs to the ruling Shiromani Akali Dal. He is a member of Punjab Legislative Assembly and represent Adampur.

Family
His father's name is Ram Lal Tinu.  in 2017 elections, he won the Adampur assembly seat from SAD.

Political career
Tinu was elected to Punjab Legislative Assembly from Adampur in 2012.

References

Living people
Punjab, India MLAs 2012–2017
Year of birth missing (living people)
Place of birth missing (living people)
Shiromani Akali Dal politicians
People from Jalandhar district
National Democratic Alliance candidates in the 2014 Indian general election